Leo Brecht (born 1962) is a German organizational theorist, consultant, Professor at the University of St. Gallen and the University of Ulm, where he directs the Institute of Technology and Process Management. He is known for his work on business process redesign.

Life and work 
Brecht received his MA in Economics and Mathematics at the University of Ulm in 1988, his PhD in Applied Statistics at the University of Konstanz in 1992, and his Habilitation in 1999 at the University of St. Gallen.

After graduation Brecht started his career as consultant for the international Information Management Group in 1993. In 1997 he moved to Andersen Business Consulting in Switzerland where he became senior manager and in 2002 managing director. In 2003 he moved to Arthur D. Little, where he became managing partner.

Since 1993 Brecht was also lecturer at the University of St. Gallen. In 2007 he was also appointed Professor at the University of St. Gallen, and in 2008 also at the University of Ulm and Managing Director of the Institute of Process and Technology Management.

Selected publications 
Brecht has published several books and articles: 
 Hess, Thomas, and Leo Brecht. State of the art des Business process redesign: Darstellung und Vergleich bestehender Methoden. Gabler, 1995.
 Bach, Volker, Leo Brecht, and Hubert Österle. Marktstudie Software-Tools für das Business Process Redesign. FBO-Verlag, 1995.
 Hubert Österle, Leo Brecht and Thomas Hess. Enabling Systematic Business Change: Integrated Methods and Software Tools for Business Process Redesign. Vieweg, Wiesbaden 1996.

References

External links 
 Prof. Dr. Leo Brecht at Ulm University

1962 births
Living people
German business theorists
Academic staff of the University of St. Gallen
Academic staff of the University of Ulm